This is a list of the buildings, sites, districts, and objects listed on the National Register of Historic Places in the Northern Mariana Islands. There currently 37 listed sites spread across the four municipalities of the Northern Mariana Islands. There are no sites listed on any of the islands that make up the Northern Islands Municipality.

Numbers of listings 
The following are approximate tallies of current listings in the Northern Mariana Islands on the National Register of Historic Places. These counts are based on entries in the National Register Information Database as of April 24, 2008 and new weekly listings posted since then on the National Register of Historic Places web site. There are frequent additions to the listings and occasional delistings and the counts here are not official. Also, the counts in this table exclude boundary increase and decrease listings which modify the area covered by an existing property or district and which carry a separate National Register reference number.

Rota

|}

Saipan

|}

Tinian

|}

See also

 List of United States National Historic Landmarks in United States commonwealths and territories, associated states, and foreign states
Maritime Heritage Trail – Battle of Saipan

References